Ngô Xuân Toàn (born 10 February 1993) is a Vietnamese association football player who is playing for V.League 1 club Hồng Lĩnh Hà Tĩnh. Xuân Toàn came up the youth ranks of the same club.

References 

1993 births
Living people
Vietnamese footballers
V.League 1 players
Song Lam Nghe An FC players
People from Nghệ An province
Association football midfielders